Eristena is a genus of moths of the family Crambidae.

Species
bifurcalis species group
Eristena bifurcalis (Pryer, 1877)
Eristena curvula F.Q. Chen, S.M. Song & C.S. Wu, 2006
Eristena longibursa F.Q. Chen, S.M. Song & C.S. Wu, 2006
Eristena lunaris You, Li & Wang, 2003
Eristena medexpansa You, Li & Wang in You, Li & Wang, 2003
Eristena minutale (Caradja, 1932)
Eristena szechuanalis (Caradja, 1934)
fulva species group
Eristena brevisigna F.Q. Chen, S.M. Song & C.S. Wu, 2006
Eristena fulva Yoshiyasu, 1987
Eristena mesilauensis Mey, 2009
Eristena monika Mey, 2009
Eristena pulchellale (Hampson, 1893)
Eristena pumila Yoshiyasu, 1987
Eristena tanongchiti Yoshiyasu, 1984
Eristena tridentata F.Q. Chen, S.M. Song & C.S. Wu, 2006
unknown species group
Eristena albifurcalis (Hampson, 1906)
Eristena araealis (Hampson, 1897)
Eristena argentata Yoshiyasu, 1988
Eristena auropunctalis (Hampson, 1903)
Eristena camptoteles (Hampson, 1906)
Eristena chrysozonalis (Hampson, 1912)
Eristena endosaris (Meyrick, 1894)
Eristena excisalis (Snellen, 1901)
Eristena fumibasale (Hampson, 1896)
Eristena gregaria Yoshiyasu, 1984
Eristena grisealis Rothschild, 1915
Eristena mangalis Murphy, 1989
Eristena melanotalis (Hampson, 1906)
Eristena murinalis Warren, 1896
Eristena oligostigmalis Hampson, 1906
Eristena ornata (Moore, 1885)
Eristena orthoteles (Meyrick, 1894)
Eristena parvalis (Moore, 1877)
Eristena postalbalis (Hampson, 1893)
Eristena shafferi Murphy, 1989
Eristena straminealis Hampson, 1903
Eristena syagrusalis (Walker, 1859)
Eristena thalassalis Murphy, 1989

References

 , 
 , 2009: New aquatic moths from high elevations of Mt. Kinabalu in northern Borneo (Lepidoptera: Pyraloidea: Acentropinae). Entomologische Zeitschrift 119 (3). 99-107.
 , 1989: Three new species of nymphuline moths from Singapore mangroves provisionally attributed to Eristena Warren (Lepidoptera: Pyralidae). Raffles Bulletin of Zoology 37 (1-2): 142-159. Full article: .
  2003: New species of Aquatic moths from the Philippines (Lepidoptera: Crambidae). Insecta Koreana 20 (1): 7-49.
 , 1999: Catalogue of the Oriental Acentropinae (Lepidoptera: Crambidae). Tijdschrift voor Entomologie 142 (1): 125-142. Full article: .
 , 2003: A taxonomic study on the genus Eristena Warren, 1896 from China (Lepidoptera: Crambidae: Nymphulinae). Acta Zootaxonomica Sinica 28 (2): 302-306.

Acentropinae
Crambidae genera
Taxa named by William Warren (entomologist)